Wędzice  is a settlement in the administrative district of Gmina Siemyśl, within Kołobrzeg County, West Pomeranian Voivodeship, in north-western Poland.

References

Villages in Kołobrzeg County